Lulin Station is an elevated metro station of Line 2 in Ningbo, Zhejiang, China. It situates on Fenghua Road. Construction of the station starts in middle 2012 and opened to service in September 26, 2015.

Exits 
Lulin Station has 2 exits.

References 

Railway stations in Zhejiang
Railway stations in China opened in 2015
Ningbo Rail Transit stations